Benny & Joon is a 1993 American romantic comedy-drama film released by Metro-Goldwyn-Mayer about how two eccentric individuals, Sam (Johnny Depp) and Juniper "Joon" (Mary Stuart Masterson), find each other and fall in love. Aidan Quinn also stars, and it was directed by Jeremiah S. Chechik.

The film is perhaps best known for Depp's humorous physical comedy routines (which are based on silent film comics Buster Keaton, Charlie Chaplin, and Harold Lloyd) and for popularizing, in the United States, the song "I'm Gonna Be (500 Miles)" by The Proclaimers. Benny & Joon was shot primarily on location in Spokane, Washington, while the train scenes at the beginning were shot near Metaline Falls, Washington.

Plot
Benjamin "Benny" Pearl and his mentally ill sister Juniper ("Joon") live together following the accidental death of their parents. Joon joins a poker game at a friend's house and loses a bet that commits Sam, the eccentric cousin of Benny's buddy Mike, to live with the Pearls. Benny is initially angry, but after an evening with Sam at the local diner and then coming home the next day to find Sam has cleaned the house, Benny decides Sam should stay.

Joon aids Sam (who is illiterate) when he is struggling with writing to his mother, and the two go to the local diner where Ruthie is working. She takes them on an errand, and then takes them home. After Ruthie stays for dinner, her car won't start, and Benny drives her home, where they set a dinner date. Meanwhile, left alone, Joon and Sam kiss. Benny and Ruthie have a fun date, but Benny abruptly ends it because he wants to get home to Joon. Sam goes to a video store to try to apply for a job there. Benny, Joon, and Sam go to a park, where Sam starts doing tricks with his hat, attracting an appreciative crowd. Benny stays at the park to reflect and sends Joon home with Sam, where they make love. Sam then tells Joon he loves her, which Joon reciprocates.

When Benny makes suggestions to Sam about his comedy routines, Joon becomes agitated and makes Sam explain that he and Joon are romantically involved. An angry Benny throws Sam out, yells at Joon, and shows her a pamphlet about a group home that would be a better home for her. Joon starts hitting Benny and screaming, and he pushes her away. Feeling bad, Benny leaves to get her some pudding. While Benny is away, Sam arrives. They pack suitcases and get on a bus, but Joon soon begins to hear voices in her head and argues with them, in great distress. Sam tries to soothe her, but she becomes more agitated. The bus is stopped, and two paramedics restrain Joon. When Benny arrives at the hospital, the doctor tells him Joon does not want to see him. He finds Sam in the waiting room, and they argue. Sam goes to stay with Ruthie. Meanwhile, Benny begins to feel guilty about his treatment of Joon.

Benny finds Sam, now working at the video store, and asks for his help. They go to the hospital. Benny apologizes to Joon, persuades her to consider getting her own apartment, and tells her that Sam has come back for her. Joon tells the doctor that she would like to try living in her own apartment. The siblings reconcile and Sam and Joon are reunited. Later, Benny brings roses to Ruthie. He takes another bouquet to Joon's apartment but leaves the flowers in the doorway when he sees Sam and Joon are busy making grilled cheese sandwiches with a clothing iron.

Cast

 Johnny Depp as Sam
 Mary Stuart Masterson as Juniper "Joon" Pearl
 Aidan Quinn as Benjamin "Benny" Pearl
 Julianne Moore as Ruthie
 Oliver Platt as Eric
 C.C.H. Pounder as Dr. Garvey
 Dan Hedaya as Thomas
 Joe Grifasi as Mike
 William H. Macy as Randy Burch
 Eileen Ryan as Mrs. Smail
 Liane Curtis as Claudia
 Lynette Walden as Female Customer
 Noon Orsatti as Patron #1
 Dan Kamin as Patron #2

Production
Laura Dern and Woody Harrelson were originally cast to play the title roles. Dern changed her mind, and Harrelson quit to take a role in Indecent Proposal. Aidan Quinn was brought in at the last minute to replace Harrelson. A lawsuit later ensued with Winona Ryder, who was dating Johnny Depp at the time and was slated to play Joon after Dern quit. Depp and Ryder broke up, leaving the role of Joon open, which was given to Masterson just days before production began.

Release

Critical reception
Roger Ebert gave the film three stars out of four and wrote "The story wants to be about love, but is also about madness, and somehow it weaves the two together with a charm that would probably not be quite so easy in real life." Owen Gleiberman gave the film a grade of "B", saying "the movie is full of absurdist fripperies we're meant to find magically funny; mostly they're just cute (Sam cooking up grilled cheese sandwiches with an iron, a poker game in which a snorkel mask and baseball tickets are used as stakes). Beneath the domesticated surrealism, though, Benny & Joon becomes genuinely touching–a love story about separation anxiety. Benny, the saintly grease monkey, thinks he has to devote his life to Joon in order to keep her out of an institution. Can he give her the space she needs to fall in love (and then take said space for himself)? You already know the answer, but Quinn and Mastersonnow gentle, now snipinglet it play out with tender conviction." Janet Maslin wrote:

On Rotten Tomatoes, Benny & Joon holds an approval rating of 76% based on 41 reviews, with an average score of 5.80/10. On Metacritic the film has a score of 57 out of 100 based on reviews from 21 critics, indicating "mixed or average reviews". Audiences polled by CinemaScore gave the film an average grade of "B" on an A+ to F scale.

Box office
In spite of its "commercially improbable story", the film became a sleeper hit, evidence of the resurgence of date movies "after a decade dominated by action film and horror films." In the first two weeks of a limited release, Benny & Joon grossed $8 million. In its domestic box office total reached over $23.2 million. It grossed $7 million internationally for a worldwide total of $30 million.

Portrayal of Mental Illness
Roger Ebert writes that Joon is "schizophrenic, although the screenplay doesn't ever say the word out loud."
David J. Robinson remarks, "More convincing features of schizophrenia (undifferentiated type) soon follow. We are told that Joon experiences auditory hallucinations, does well with a stable routine, and takes medication on a daily basis. Her use of language is one of her most interesting attributes. She uses the last housekeeper's surname ("Smail") to refer to anyone who might fill the position, which is how Sam (Johnny Depp) enters her life." E. Fuller Torrey calls the film "a beautifully filmed, but unrealistic story about a brother who is the sole caretaker of his kid sister, who has schizophrenia. ... While the film addresses such issues as noncompliance with medication and disputes over independent living arrangements, the bad times are never too severe or long-lasting. Reviewers Mick Martin and Marsha Porter remarked "[Although] most viewers will enjoy this bittersweet comedy ... Folks coping with mental illness in real life will be offended by yet another film in which the problem is sanitized and trivialized".

Later commentary on the film recognises that Joon demonstrates many traits of autism, including living with a rigid structure, “meltdowns” when this structure is changed, eating primarily the same foods without variation, having “special interest/s” that are a great focus of daily life, and general difficulties with socialising tied to an average or greater level of skill in other tasks. It is also common for autistic people to be misdiagnosed or co-diagnosed with conditions such as schizophrenia, or mood disorders such as depression. Psychotic episodes and auditory hallucinations, or “hearing voices” as Joon reportedly does, has been observed to be more common in autistic people than the neurotypical population, likely due to greater average stress and poor mental health caused by difficulty with everyday demands.
In this context, the film has been described as positive in its implied representation of autism, as the disorder does not ultimately stop Joon from living the life that she desires. Further comments have been made noting potential autistic traits in Sam, with one reviewer then describing the film as “an autistic love story”.

Musical adaptation
A stage musical adaptation of the movie premiered at the Old Globe Theatre in San Diego, California, from September 2 to October 22, 2017. The musical features music by Nolan Gasser, lyrics by Mindi Dickstein, book by Kirsten Guenther, choreography by Scott Rink and direction by Jack Cummings III. The show ran at Paper Mill Playhouse in Millburn, New Jersey, from April 4 to May 5, 2019. The Paper Mill production featured Claybourne Elder as Benny, Hannah Elless as Joon and Bryce Pinkham as Sam.

Accolades

References

External links

 
 
 

1990s English-language films
1990s romantic comedy-drama films
1993 comedy films
1993 drama films
1993 films
American romantic comedy-drama films
Fictional duos
Fictional portrayals of schizophrenia
Films about psychiatry
Films about schizophrenia
Films directed by Jeremiah S. Chechik
Films scored by Rachel Portman
Films shot in Washington (state)
Metro-Goldwyn-Mayer films
1990s American films